Joan Margaret Tetzel (June 21, 1921 – October 31, 1977) was an American actress.

Early years
Tetzel was born in New York City and grew up in the Spuyten Duyvil section of the Bronx. Her father, an illustrator, was Austrian, and her mother was Scottish-Canadian.

Radio career
Tetzel played in When a Girl Marries and Woman of Courage, both on CBS.

Film career
Tetzel is noted for her performance in Alfred Hitchcock's The Paradine Case (1947), in which she played "Judy Flaquer", the daughter of the solicitor played by Charles Coburn in the film. In the movie, she is the confidante and best friend of the wife (Ann Todd) of defense lawyer Anthony Keane (Gregory Peck), and is able to objectively see how Keane is ruining his marriage because of his infatuation with Mrs. Paradine (Alida Valli).

Her other film appearances included Duel in the Sun (1946), The File on Thelma Jordon (1950), Hell Below Zero (1954) and Joy in the Morning (1965).

TV career

Tetzel also worked with Alfred Hitchcock in his TV series Alfred Hitchcock Presents. She played "Eve Ross" in the Alfred Hitchcock Presents episode "Guest for Breakfast". In 1963, she appeared as Marian Stuart, wife of the title character, in Perry Mason's, "The Case of the Decadent Dean." Tetzel also made appearances on Thriller ("An Attractive Family" and "The Devil's Ticket") and Gunsmoke.

Theater career
Aside from her movie career, Tetzel was a well-known stage actress. She appeared in the 1940 revival of Liliom, the original stage production of I Remember Mama, and portrayed Nurse Ratched in the stage production of One Flew Over the Cuckoo's Nest on Broadway. As a noted stage actress, her photo appeared on the front cover of Life Magazine on Monday 16 February 1948.

Tetzel's other Broadway credits include The Winner (1953), Red Gloves (1948), Strange Bedfellows (1947), Pretty Little Parlor (1943), Peepshow (1943), Harriet (1942), The Damask Cheek (1942), and The Happy Days (1940).

Marriages
Her first husband was radio producer John E. Mosman. Her second husband was Oscar Homolka (1898–1978), whom she married in 1949.

Death
Tetzel died October 31, 1977, at her home Beri-Be-Dahn, Fairwarp, Sussex, England, aged 56, from cancer and pneumonia.

Partial filmography
Duel in the Sun (1946) - Helen Langford
The Paradine Case (1947) - Judy Flaquer
The File on Thelma Jordon (1950) - Pamela Blackwell Marshall
Hell Below Zero (1954) - Judie Nordhal
The Red Dress (1954) - Pandora (segment "Meet Mr. Jones' story)
Joy in the Morning (1965) - Beverly Karter

References

External links

 
 
 

1921 births
1977 deaths
Actresses from New York City
American stage actresses
American film actresses
American television actresses
American expatriates in the United Kingdom
Deaths from cancer in England
20th-century American actresses
20th-century American singers
American people of Austrian descent
American people of Canadian descent
American people of Scottish descent